is a Japanese international rugby union player who plays in the prop position.

Early / Provincial Career

Born and raised in Yamanashi, Asahara played rugby all the way through school and university.   He signed up with the Toshiba Brave Lupus in 2010 and has been a regular with them ever since.

Super Rugby Career

Asahara was selected as a member of the first ever Sunwolves squad ahead of the 2016 Super Rugby season.   He played 14 matches in their debut campaign.

International

Asahara played 5 matches for Japan in 2013, making his debut for the Brave Blossoms on 20 April in a match against the Philippines.   He hasn't played for his country since June 2013.

Super Rugby Statistics

References

1987 births
Living people
Japanese rugby union players
Japan international rugby union players
Rugby union props
Toshiba Brave Lupus Tokyo players
Sunwolves players
Sportspeople from Yamanashi Prefecture
Hosei University alumni
Hino Red Dolphins players